Étienne Le Doux Moussa Pokong (born 13 August 1987 in Garoua) is a Cameroonian football player who plays for AO Poros.

Club career
Pokong transferred to Club Africain in January 2006, he came from FS d'Akonolinga. After three years resign with the Tunisian club Club Africain to join Al-Khor Sports Club.

On 20 August 2019, Pokong joined Greece club AO Poros.

International career
He earned his first call-up for the Cameroon national football team on 14 October 2007 for a qualification game against Morocco national football team.

References

External links
 

1987 births
Living people
Cameroonian footballers
Association football forwards
Cameroon international footballers
Club Africain players
Al-Khor SC players
US Monastir (football) players
Makedonikos F.C. players
Iraklis Psachna F.C. players
Football League (Greece) players
Tunisian Ligue Professionnelle 1 players
Qatar Stars League players
Expatriate footballers in Tunisia
Cameroonian expatriate sportspeople in Tunisia
Expatriate footballers in Qatar
Cameroonian expatriate sportspeople in Qatar
Expatriate footballers in Greece
Cameroonian expatriate sportspeople in Greece